The Scout and Guide movement in Venezuela is served by
 Asociación de Guías Scouts de Venezuela, member of the World Association of Girl Guides and Girl Scouts
 Asociación de Scouts de Venezuela, member of the World Organization of the Scout Movement
 Federación de Boy Scouts Independientes de Venezuela

International Scouting units in Venezuela 
In addition, there are American Boy Scouts in Maracaibo, linked to the Direct Service branch of the Boy Scouts of America, which supports units around the world.

See also

External links
 History of Scouting in Venezuela - (Historia del Escultismo en Venezuela)